Iraqforce was a British and Commonwealth formation that came together in the Kingdom of Iraq. The formation fought in the Middle East during World War II.

Background
During World War I, the British Army defeated the Ottoman Army in the Middle East during the Mesopotamian Campaign. Subsequently, the League of Nations designated Mesopotamia as the British Mandate of Mesopotamia. From 1920 to the early 1930s, RAF Iraq Command was created as an inter-service command in charge of all British forces in the mandate-controlled Kingdom of Iraq and was commanded by an RAF officer normally of Air Vice-Marshal rank.

In 1932, the British mandate in Iraq ended and according to the Anglo-Iraqi Treaty of 1930, the United Kingdom was permitted to maintain troops in Iraq. In 1933 or 1934, RAF Iraq Command was renamed the British Forces in Iraq. By the late 1930s, these forces were restricted to two Royal Air Force stations, RAF Shaibah near Basra and RAF Habbaniya west of Baghdad.

On 1 April 1941, during World War II, Rashid Ali seized power in Iraq via a coup d'état'. Ali was supported by three senior Royal Iraqi Army officers and one Royal Iraqi Air Force officer, known as the Golden Square. Rashid Ali proclaimed himself Chief of the National Defence Government. His new government was immediately recognised by Nazi Germany; it was openly pro-Nazi and anti-British.

Nomenclature
The ground forces from India that landed in Basra were initially known as Sabine Force (Major-General William Fraser). From 8 May 1941, Fraser was replaced and the forces in Basra were commanded by Lieutenant-General Edward Quinan. On 18 June, Quinan was placed in command of all ground forces in Iraq which included Sabine Force and British Forces in Iraq as Iraqforce. From 21 June, Iraqforce was called Iraq Command. On 1 September 1941, after Persia (modern Iran) was invaded, Iraq Command was renamed "Persia and Iraq Force" (PAI Force). PAI Force was still commanded by Quinan and he still reported to India Command. Iraqforce was variously part of India Command, Middle East Command and then Persia and Iraq Command.

Prelude
Sabine Force was despatched from Karachi by GHQ India to seize the port of Basra and to supplement the British Forces in Iraq at RAF Shaibah and RAF Habbaniya. British Prime Minister Winston Churchill saw Basra as a major supply base in the future for material from the United States. Churchill did not recognise Rashid Ali's "National Defence Government" as legitimate. Churchill also wanted to reinstate a more compliant Iraqi government and to protect British interests in Iraq, notably the oilfields of which the British-owned Anglo-Persian Oil Company was concession holder. On 18 April, a brigade from Karachi landed and captured Basra; on 30 April, a second brigade arrived. The Rashid Ali government demanded that the British forces be removed from Iraq and Iraqi forces took up positions around RAF Habbaniya. On 2 May, British aircraft from Habbaniya launched a surprise attack on Iraqi forces throughout the country.

Military operations

Anglo-Iraqi War

During the ensuing war, a force from the British Mandate of Palestine, known as Habbaniya Force (shortened to Habforce), advanced into Iraq from Transjordan. Habforce, with Kingcol in the lead, was to relieve the British garrison forces besieged at the Royal Air Force treaty base at RAF Habbaniya. The threat to Habbaniya was removed by actions of the garrison before any elements of Habforce arrived. After it arrived, Habforce and a portion of the Habbaniya garrison then advanced through Fallujah to capture Baghdad. By 31 May, an armistice had been signed and the government collapsed. From early May, the troops in Iraq were under the operational control of Army Headquarters, Middle East Command in Cairo, reverting to India command on 18 June. From 21 June, Iraqforce became known as the Iraq Command.

Syria-Lebanon Campaign

In June and July 1941, after Iraq was secured, elements of Iraqforce/Iraq Command took part in the Syria–Lebanon campaign and, while active in Syria, they once more came under the authority of the Cairo Headquarters.

Anglo-Soviet Invasion of Persia

In late August 1941, Iraq Command conducted the Anglo-Soviet invasion of Persia, in conjunction with forces advancing from the Soviet Union. A new formation, Hazelforce, based on the 2nd Indian Armoured Brigade was formed within Iraq Command during this effort. On 1 September, after Persia (modern Iran) was secured, Iraq Command was renamed "Persia and Iraq Force" or Paiforce. Paiforce was still commanded by Quinan and he still reported to India Command. In January 1942, Persia and Iraq once again came under Middle East Command and, in February 1942, Quinan's headquarters was re-designated as Tenth Army.

In 1942, with the growing threat from the German advance in the Caucasus, it was felt that the area should come under a General Headquarters which could bring a specific focus to the area. Previous experience of controlling the area from Cairo and Delhi had not proved ideal and both these General Headquarters were by this time fully committed in the Western Desert Campaign and to the Burma Campaign respectively. In August 1942, it was decided therefore, as part of the changes made bringing in Alexander and Montgomery to Middle East Command and Auchinleck to India Command, to create a new Persia and Iraq Command, to be led by General Sir Maitland Wilson and based in Baghdad.

Orders of battle

Iraq, May 1941
Commanded by Major-General William Fraser (until 8 May). Lieutenant-General Edward Quinan (from 8 May).
 10th Indian Infantry Division - Major-General W.A.K. Fraser (until 16 May). Major-General William Slim (from 16 May).
 13th Duke of Connaught's Own Lancers (reconnaissance regiment in armoured cars)
 3rd Field Regiment Royal Artillery
 32nd Field Regiment Royal Artillery
 157th Field Regiment Royal Artillery
 20th Indian Infantry Brigade- Brigadier Donald Powell
 2nd battalion 8th Gurkha Rifles
 2nd battalion 7th Gurkha Rifles
 3rd battalion 11th Sikh Regiment
 21st Indian Infantry Brigade- Brigadier Charles Weld
 4th battalion 13th Frontier Force Rifles
 2nd battalion 4th Gurkha Rifles
 2nd battalion 10th Gurkha Rifles
 25th Indian Infantry Brigade - Brigadier Ronald Mountain
 3rd battalion 9th Jat Regiment
 2nd Royal battalion 11th Sikh Regiment
 1st battalion 5th Mahratta Light Infantry
 Ground Forces at RAF Habbaniya - Air Vice-Marshal Harry Smart (until 5 May). Colonel Ouvry Roberts (from 5 May).
 1st battalion The King's Own Royal Regiment (Lancaster)
 1,200 Assyrian and Iraqi Levies - Lieutenant-Colonel J. A. Brawn
 Number 1 Armoured Car Company RAF 
 Habforce commanded by Major-General John Clark
 Mechanized squadron of the Transjordan Frontier Force - Refused to enter Iraq and were disarmed.
 Detachment of the Arab Legion - John Glubb "Glubb Pasha"
 Striking force Kingcol - Brigadier James Kingstone
 4th Cavalry Brigade - Lieutenant-Colonel Andrew Ferguson
 Composite Household Cavalry Regiment
 The Warwickshire Yeomanry
 The Royal Wiltshire Yeomanry
 237th Battery 60th Field Regiment, Royal Artillery
 A & D Companies, 1st Battalion Essex Regiment - Major K. F. May - Accompanied by two Bren gun carriers. Personnel carried in transport of the Royal Army Service Corps.
 One anti-tank troop, Royal Artillery
 Number 2 Armoured Car Company RAF 
 Two supply companies, Royal Army Service Corps
 Main Body - Lieutenant-Colonel John Nichols, MC
 Headquarters 1st Cavalry Division (elements)
 1st Battalion Essex Regiment
 60th Field Regiment, Royal Artillery
 One Battery of anti-tank guns, Royal Artillery

Formed from existing units in early June:
 Gocol - R. E. S. Gooch
 Mercol - E. J. H. Merry
 Harcol - R. J. Hardy

Arriving At Basra on 9 June:
 17th Indian Infantry Brigade (detached from 8th Indian Infantry Division) - Brigadier Douglas Gracey
 1st Battalion Royal Fusiliers
 1st Battalion (Prince of Wales Own Sikhs) 12th Frontier Force Regiment
 1st Battalion 5th Royal Gurkha Rifles

Arriving at Basra on 16 June:
 24th Indian Infantry Brigade - Brigadier Roger Le Fleming
 2nd Battalion 6th Rajputana Rifles
 The Kumaon Rifles
 5th Battalion 5th Mahratta Light Infantry

Syria: June–July 1941

Commanded by Lieutenant General Edward Quinan

During the Syria–Lebanon Campaign Iraqforce consisted of:
 10th Indian Infantry Division -Major-General William Slim
 20th Indian Infantry Brigade - Brigadier Donald Powell
 21st Indian Infantry Brigade - Brigadier C. J. Weld
 25th Indian Infantry Brigade - Brigadier Ronald Mountain
 17th Indian Infantry Brigade (detached from 8th Indian Infantry Division) - Brigadier Douglas Gracey
 Habforce - Major-General J. G. W. Clark
 4th Cavalry Brigade - Brigadier J. J. Kingstone
 1st Battalion The Essex Regiment
 Arab Legion Mechanized Regiment
 237th Battery 60th Field Regiment, Royal Artillery
 An Australian battery of 2 pounder anti-tank guns
 169th Light Anti-aircraft Battery

Iran: August–September 1941

Commanded by Lieutenant General Edward Quinan

During the Anglo-Soviet invasion of Persia (Iran) Iraqforce was renamed Paiforce, consisting of:
 10th Indian Infantry Division - Major-General William Slim (took overall command of the ground forces)
 8th Indian Infantry Division - commanded by Major-General Charles Harvey
 18th Indian Infantry Brigade - Brigadier Rupert Lochner
 19th Indian Infantry Brigade - Brigadier Charles Ford
 24th Indian Infantry Brigade (until 11 September) - Brigadier Roger Le Fleming
 25th Indian Infantry Brigade (detached from 10th Indian Infantry Division) - Brigadier Ronald Mountain
 13th Duke of Connaught's Own Lancers
 Hazelforce - Brigadier John Aizlewood
 2nd Indian Armoured Brigade Group - Brigadier John Aizlewood
 9th Armoured Brigade (formerly the 4th Cavalry Brigade) - Brigadier John Currie
 21st Indian Infantry Brigade (detached from 10th Indian Infantry Division) - Brigadier C. J. Weld
 6th Indian Infantry Division (from 11 September) - Major-General James Thomson
 17th Queen Victoria's Own Cavalry (Poona Horse)
 27th Indian Infantry Brigade - Brigadier Alan Blaxland
 24th Indian Infantry Brigade (transferred from 8th Indian Infantry Division) - Brigadier Roger Le Fleming

See also 
 RAF Iraq Command
 Tenth Army (United Kingdom)
 1941 Iraqi coup d'état

Notes 
Footnotes

Citations

References 

 
 
 
 
 
  officially published in 
  in

External links 
 
 Ravi Rikhye, India: Paiforce 1942–43, http://www.orbat.com, June 2002
 

Military units and formations established in 1941
Military units and formations of the British Army in World War II
Ad hoc units and formations of the British Army
Military history of India during World War II
Middle East theatre of World War II
Military history of Iraq
Iraq in World War II
World War II orders of battle
Iraq–United Kingdom relations